Remember Me This Way may refer to:

 Remember Me This Way (film), a 1974 documentary about Gary Glitter
 Remember Me This Way (album), a soundtrack album from the film
 "Remember Me This Way" (song), the title song from the film and album
 "Remember Me This Way", a song by Jordan Hill, featured in the 1995 film Casper
 "Remember Me This Way", a song by The Legendary Pink Dots from From Here You'll Watch the World Go By (1995)